Tân Phong is a ward located in Biên Hòa city of Đồng Nai province, Vietnam. It has an area of about 16.8km2 and the population in 2018 was 42,031.

Biên Hòa Airbase and Đồng Nai province Square located in Tân Phong ward.

References

Bien Hoa